"Maybe" is a song by American musician Machine Gun Kelly. It was released on March 16, 2022, as the fourth single from his sixth studio album Mainstream Sellout. The song features performances from members of the British rock band Bring Me the Horizon.

Background
"Maybe" was first premiered on March 4, 2022, at the "Emo Nite" live event club night at Los Angeles' Avalon Hollywood venue. The song was released as the fourth single from Machine Gun Kelly's sixth studio album on March 16, Mainstream Sellout, after "Papercuts", "Emo Girl", and "Ay!". The song features members of the British rock band Bring Me the Horizon; the track is their second collaboration of 2022, following their remixed version of "Bad Habits" with Ed Sheeran.

An acoustic variation of the song was released on June 23, 2022 alongside the release of "Life in Pink Deluxe" version of the Mainstream Sellout album. As of July 25th, 2022 the official audio version is approaching 300k views and over 12k likes.

Themes and composition
Rolling Stone described the song as "pop punk, albeit with some signature screaming from Sykes". The song features alternating vocals from Kelly and Sykes, with clean, melodic vocals throughout, and "deathcore-styled screaming" in the bridge by Sykes alone. The song opens up with a chant of "2,3,5!" by Kelly, as he felt the typical start of "1,2,3" was boring. BrooklynVegan, Louder Sound, Pitchfork and Wall of Sound compared the track to the sound of Paramore's song "Misery Business", a song that Kelly had covered in the past. Far Out Magazine stated that the intro sounds similar to Soundgarden's "Black Hole Sun" and that the main guitar riff sounds similar to +44's "When Your Heart Stops Beating". The Daily Californian described it as a combination of Everlast's "What It's Like", and AFI's "Miss Murder" and the general sound of Blink-182. Clash compared the guitars to Linkin Park.

Reception
Wall of Sound praised the song for being a "certainly decent track" and a "stand out on the album for alternative fans", whereas Kerrang! referred to it as a "massive banger". Clash also praised it, calling the song a "total delight". Other publications were less positive, critiquing it for its lack of originality. MetalSucks referred to it as "bland and predictable", while BrooklynVegan complained that it was too similar to Paramore's "Misery Business", to the point of declaring they felt Kelly probably owed the band royalty payments. Far Out Magazine called it terrible and said that the intro is "cringe-inducing". Sputnikmusic said that Oli Sykes outshines Baker due to not being completely tone-deaf. Wall of Sounds album reviewer also felt differently about the track, concluding that "expectations fell short here."

Music video
The official music video for "Maybe" was released on March 25, 2022 and was directed by Marc Klasfeld.

The video is set and recorded inside The Shard in London, England where Machine Gun Kelly performs the song alongside Bring Me the Horizon's Oli Sykes and Blink-182's drummer and album's producer Travis Barker, as the glass from The Shard shatters around them and forms into a massive cloud over the city as the song culminates and ends.

Personnel
Credits adapted from Tidal.Musicians Colson Baker – lead vocals, composer, lyricist, guitars
 Oliver Sykes – featured vocals, composer, lyricist
 Lee Malia – guitars
 Jordan Fish – keyboards, programming, percussion, backing vocals, composer, lyricist
 Matt Kean – bass guitars
 Matt Nicholls – drumsAdditional personnel'

 Travis Barker – producer, composer, lyricist
 Omer Fedi – producer, composer, lyricist
 Adam Hawkins – mixing, studio personnel 
 Chris Gehringer – mastering engineer, studio personnel
 Nick Long – producer, co-producer, composer, lyricist 
 BazeXX – producer
 SlimXX – producer
 Stephen Basil – composer, lyricist
 Brandon Allen – composer, lyricist
 K Thrash – engineer, studio personnel
 Henry Lunetta – assistant mixer, studio personnel
 Hunter Smith – assistant mixer, studio personnel

Charts

Weekly charts

Year-end charts

References

2022 singles
2022 songs
Bring Me the Horizon songs
Machine Gun Kelly (musician) songs
Song recordings produced by Travis Barker
Songs written by Machine Gun Kelly (musician)
Songs written by Oliver Sykes
Songs written by Omer Fedi
Songs written by Travis Barker
Post-hardcore songs